Anoectochilus zhejiangensis is a species of plant in the family Orchidaceae. Endemic to China (Fujian, Guangxi, and Zhejiang provinces), individuals are found primarily in damp forest and valleys. Standing from 8 to 16 cm tall, the orchids are defined by their reddish-brown stems and pale petals.

References

Endemic orchids of China
zhejiangensis
Endangered plants
Flora of Fujian
Flora of Guangxi
Flora of Zhejiang
Plants described in 1989
Taxonomy articles created by Polbot